Carrollwood Village is an unincorporated community in Hillsborough County, Florida, United States. Along with neighboring Carrollwood, it is part of the Carrollwood census-designated place. The ZIP codes for the community are 33624 and 33618. Carrollwood Village was its own census-designated place during the 1990 census, with a recorded population of 15,051.

Geography
Carrollwood Village is located at 28.1 degrees north, 82.5 degrees west (28.068, -82.521).

Carrollwood Village boundaries include Gunn Highway to the south, Dale Mabry Highway to the east, Northdale to the north, and Citrus Park to the west.

Areas in Carrollwood Village
Carrollwood Village consists of the following neighborhoods.

Carrollwood Country Club
Along with the development of the housing community was the development of a 27-hole golf course, the Carrollwood Village Golf and Country Club. This course entertained some Senior PGA tournaments in the 1980s. The club changed names three times - first to the Country Club of Carrollwood in 2001, then to Emerald Greens Golf Resort & Country Club in 2003, then to Carrollwood Country Club in 2013. As Emerald Greens, all holes on the course were renovated or redesigned, a new club house and recreation center were built, along with Condos, Vacation Villas, resurfaced tennis courts and a new pool area. The name changed to Carrollwood Country Club to preserve the original history of the club, opening in the 1970s.

Transportation
Some of the major roads serving the community are Dale Mabry Highway, Turner Road, Gunn Highway, and Ehrlich Road.

Education
The community of Carrollwood Village is served by Hillsborough County Schools.

See also
 Carrollwood
 Carrollwood (CDP), a census-designated place which consists of the communities of Carrollwood and Carrollwood Village

References

External links
 Official website
 Carrollwood Village profile from Hometown Locator

Unincorporated communities in Hillsborough County, Florida
Former census-designated places in Hillsborough County, Florida
Unincorporated communities in Florida
Former census-designated places in Florida
Planned communities in Florida